ASTA: The War of Tears and Winds (Korean: 아스타) was a massively multiplayer online role-playing game created by South Korean developer Polygon Games. The game was in development from 2010 through mid-October 2013.

The game featured two warring factions, large-scale player versus player and Realm versus Realm combat and has been touted as "the Asian World of Warcraft."

ASTA: The War of Tears and Winds was published in North America and Europe by Webzen Games, launched on March 2, 2016 and shut down its servers on October 4, 2016.

Asta Online was re-released on Steam in July 2017 but then later shutdown again due to unknown reasons. The game still appears on Steam however it cannot be downloaded.

Setting
ASTA takes place in a high fantasy setting heavily inspired by East Asian myths, legends, and philosophy.

References

External links

Official website

CryEngine games
Fantasy massively multiplayer online role-playing games
Free-to-play video games
Massively multiplayer online role-playing games
2016 video games
Video games developed in South Korea
Windows games
Windows-only games
Inactive massively multiplayer online games
Webzen games